I'm Sorry I Haven't a Clue is a BBC radio comedy panel game. Billed as "the antidote to panel games", it consists of two teams of two comedians being given "silly things to do" by a chairman. The show was launched in April 1972 as a parody of radio and TV panel games, and has been broadcast since on BBC Radio 4 and the BBC World Service, with repeats aired on BBC Radio 4 Extra and, in the 1980s and 1990s, on BBC Radio 2. The 50th series was broadcast in November and December 2007.

After a period of split chairmanship in the first series, Humphrey Lyttelton ("Humph") served in this role from the programme's inception until his hospitalisation and subsequent death in 2008, which led to the cancellation of the 51st series. The show recommenced on 15 June 2009 with Lyttelton replaced by three hosts: Stephen Fry, Jack Dee and Rob Brydon. Dee went on to host all episodes of the 52nd series later that year, and continues in that role. The chairman's script was most recently written by Iain Pattinson, who worked on the show from 1992 until his death in 2021.

History

I'm Sorry I Haven't a Clue developed from the long-running radio sketch show I'm Sorry, I'll Read That Again, the writers of which were John Cleese, Jo Kendall, David Hatch, Bill Oddie, Tim Brooke-Taylor and especially Graeme Garden who suggested the idea of an unscripted show which, it was decided, would take the form of a parody panel game. A panel game with no competition was not itself a new idea: the BBC had a history of successful quiz shows designed to allow witty celebrities to entertain where winning was not important. Examples include Ignorance Is Bliss, Just a Minute, My Word! and My Music on the radio and Call My Bluff on television.

The pilot episode (at that time titled I'm Sorry, They're At It Again) opened with Graeme Garden and Jo Kendall singing the words of "Three Blind Mice" to the tune of "Ol' Man River" followed by Bill Oddie and Tim Brooke-Taylor performing the lyrics of "Sing a Song of Sixpence" to the melody of "These Foolish Things". Dave Lee, who was bandleader on I'm Sorry I'll Read That Again, was at the piano and a number of rounds were introduced by a short phrase of music. Other rounds included "Dialogue Read in a Specific Accent" and "Songs Sung as Animals". In 1974 Bill Oddie was replaced by Willie Rushton, with Barry Cryer as Graeme Garden's teammate, and Humphrey Lyttelton as chairman, and the personnel remained constant from this point until Rushton's death in 1996, although occasional guest panellists appeared in the 1980s and early 1990s (see below). Since then the panel has featured a variety of guest comedians.

The show has over two million listeners on Radio 4 and its recording sessions typically fill 1,500-seat theatres within a week of being advertised. At least one recording for the spring 2006 series filled all its seats within three hours of the free tickets being made available, and the London recording of the autumn series in that year sold out in ten minutes. Although there are twelve Clue shows broadcast per year these are the result of just six recording sessions, with two programmes being recorded back-to-back. The show was recently voted the second funniest radio programme ever, after The Goon Show. It has a large following among professional comedians such as Armando Iannucci, who turned down opportunities to work on it as he preferred to remain a listener.

The official, authorised history of the show and ISIRTA, The Clue Bible by Jem Roberts, was published by Preface Publishing in October 2009.

Participants

Chairman
Humphrey Lyttelton, primarily known as a jazz trumpeter and bandleader, and known as Humph to his friends, was invited to be chairman because of the role played by improvisation in both comedy and jazz music. In the first series Lyttelton shared the role of chairman with Barry Cryer but he made it his own (especially once Cryer replaced Cleese as a regular panellist) and continued as chairman until his death on 25 April 2008. He read the script introducing the programme and segments in an utterly deadpan manner. He claimed the secret was just to read what was in front of him without understanding why it was funny. He adopted the grumpy persona of someone who would really rather be somewhere else, which he attributed to worrying that, surrounded by four professional comedians, he would have nothing worthwhile to chip in. He did occasionally depart from the script, however, often bringing the house down with an ad-lib. He was credited by the regular panellists as being the chief reason for the show's longevity.

On 18 April 2008 the producer of I'm Sorry I Haven't A Clue, Jon Naismith, announced that, owing to hospitalisation to repair an aortic aneurysm, Humphrey Lyttelton would be unable to record the scheduled shows and that they would have to be postponed. The final show of the 2008 Best of tour on 22 April would be presented by Rob Brydon. Following Lyttelton's death there was speculation that the series might be cancelled because replacing him would be extremely difficult if not impossible. In a eulogy in The Guardian, Barry Cryer did not allude to the future of the programme but said that there's "got to be an agonising reappraisal" and that Lyttelton was the "very hub of the show". Cryer, Tim Brooke-Taylor and Graeme Garden all ruled themselves out as hosts: Cryer did not think the programme would work if a panellist became chairman and it "would need somebody of stature to be parachuted in". Jeremy Hardy also ruled himself out, saying "Humph had big shoes to fill and I wouldn't do it."

In the Clue mailout for September 2008 Naismith stated: "Despite the rumours, we've made no decisions about possible replacements for Humph, and are unlikely to make any decisions this year at least. Certainly I don't envisage us selecting anyone on a permanent basis for several series." It was announced that the show would continue recording beginning in 2009. The first new shows would be hosted by rotating guest presenters (similarly to the format of Have I Got News for You) before a permanent replacement host was decided. In the Clue mailout for February 2009 Naismith announced that Stephen Fry, Jack Dee and Rob Brydon would host two shows each, to be recorded in April, May and June 2009 respectively. The programme returned on 15 June 2009, chaired by Fry with the usual panellists and special guest Victoria Wood. Every series since then has been chaired by Dee.

Panellists
The regular panellists for much of the show's history were:
Graeme Garden was a member of the I'm Sorry, I'll Read That Again team from which the programme grew and has been a panellist since the first episode. Lyttelton described him as very dry, biding his time before stepping in with a perfect punchline. Garden was absent from January 2016 for the whole of series 65, 66 and 67. On 12 October 2017, Garden announced that he would be rejoining the team, but has only appeared infrequently since then. Following the death of Barry Cryer, Garden is the last surviving original panellist.
Barry Cryer hosted six episodes in the show's first series before moving to a permanent seat on the panel. He was credited by then-chairman Lyttelton as being the show's "bricks and mortar", providing quick-fire one-liners in any situation. There is a running joke in the programme that he is a dirty old man with a drink problem. He died aged 86 in January 2022.
Tim Brooke-Taylor was also part of the I'm Sorry, I'll Read That Again team and was also with the show from the start until his death in April 2020. He was very popular with the crowd and adopted a vulnerable persona. Garden and Brooke-Taylor had previously worked together on television in The Goodies and Brooke-Taylor in particular would occasionally drop references to that show into some of the games, eliciting cheers from the audience.
Willie Rushton was one of the regular panel members from 1974 until his death in 1996. The other panellists have fond memories of his off-the-wall sense of humour and quick-fire puns. Since Rushton's death his seat has been turned into a permanent guest spot, which was often filled by the late Jeremy Hardy when on non-broadcast tours. Guests have also appeared when one of the regulars was unavailable.

Producers
The show has had a number of producers over the years:
David Hatch (produced only the pilot episode in 1972)
John Cassels (1972–74)
Simon Brett (1975–77)
Geoffrey Perkins (1978–81)
Paul Mayhew-Archer (1982–86)
Paul Spencer (1987–89)
Jon Magnusson (1990–91)
Jon Naismith (1991–present)

Musical accompaniment
Early episodes featured Dave Lee, who provided piano accompaniment on I'm Sorry, I'll Read That Again. However, Colin Sell now usually fills this role. He is often the butt of jokes about his musical ability, to which he is unable to respond as he has no microphone.  For example: "When music experts hear Colin's compositions, they say he could have been another Berlin, Porter or anybody else employed by the German State Railway." Guest pianists are called in when Sell has been unable to attend (or the ISIHAC team have "won the coin toss" as Lyttelton once said on the show), including Neil Innes, Denis King and Matthew Scott. Lyttelton's band also appeared on a couple of Christmas specials. On one occasion when Innes was guesting, Lyttelton outlined the musician's career, concluding that this "has brought him to where he is today: standing in for Colin Sell." In another appearance Innes sang along to his own composition "I'm the Urban Spaceman" during a round of "Pick Up Song".

The theme music is called "The Schickel Shamble", by Ron Goodwin, and is from the film Monte Carlo or Bust! It was chosen by David Hatch.

Guests
Guests have included:

 Pam Ayres (2018)
 Bill Bailey (2002)
 Max Boyce (1998)
 Jo Brand (2009, 2014, 2017, 2019–20, 2022)
 Rory Bremner (2016, 2018, 2020–22)
 Marcus Brigstocke (2011, 2019–22)
 Rob Brydon (2006–07, 2009, 2011–13, 2015, 2018, 2021)
 Susan Calman (2014–18)
 John Cleese (regular panel member during the first series, 1972)
 Denise Coffey (1979, 1981, 1983, 1991, 1997)
 Jon Culshaw (2021–22)
 Jack Dee (2004–05, 2007)
 Omid Djalili (2014–15, 2021)
 Pippa Evans (2016, 2019–22)
 Kenny Everett (1985)
 John Finnemore (2013–14, 2017–18, 2021–22)
 Stephen Fry (1986–87, 1989, 1997, 1999–2000, 2002, 2007, 2012, 2019)
 Kerry Godliman (2018)
 Andy Hamilton (1999, 2001–02, 2004–07, 2011, 2014, 2017, 2020–22)
 Mike Harding (1984, 1986)
 Jeremy Hardy (1995, 1998–2007, 2009–12, 2015–18)
 Tony Hawks (1995, 1997, 1999–2006, 2012–22)
 Harry Hill (2003, 2005, 2014, 2019–20, 2022)
 Milton Jones (2021–22)
 John Junkin (1975, 1979, 1986)
 Phill Jupitus (1999, 2001, 2009–10)
 Miles Jupp (2013, 2015–17, 2019–21)
 Jo Kendall (regular panel member during the first series, 1972)
 Jonathan Lynn (1978)
 Fred MacAulay (1998–99, 2016, 2021–22)
 Lee Mack (2021)
 Paul Merton (1991–92, 1994, 1997–98)
 David Mitchell (2009–11, 2013)
 Neil Mullarkey (2000)
 Ross Noble (2003, 2005, 2011–12)
 Bill Oddie (regular panel member during the first two series, 1972–73)
 Richard Osman (2016, 2018–19)
 Rachel Parris (2019–22)
 Vicki Pepperdine (2021–22)
 Caroline Quentin (2018)
 Jan Ravens (2017, 2021–22)
 Linda Smith (2001, 2004)
 Bill Tidy (1985, 1989, replacement for Tim Brooke-Taylor for one series in 1991)
 Sandi Toksvig (1997–2003, 2005, 2010, 2015–16, 2019–20)
 Henning Wehn (2021)
 Victoria Wood (2009, 2012–13)

Raymond Baxter was occasionally drafted to commentate on sessions of Mornington Crescent and also presented the one-off special Everyman's Guide to Mornington Crescent. Both Judi Dench and Alan Titchmarsh took part in "Celebrity What's My Line?". Judi Dench and Michael Gambon performed the Mornington Crescent drama The Bromley by Bow Stratagem. Alan Titchmarsh also played every questioner (that is, famous gardeners) on a 2012 show which featured Victoria Wood. A 2013 episode featured a round of Useless Celebrities, a parody of Pointless Celebrities, and featured Richard Osman as the co-presenter (this was broadcast three years before Osman appeared on the panel). A 2017 episode featured a spoof of The Chase which featured Anne Hegerty, one of the Chasers from the show.

On one occasion Humph announced that they had a very distinguished actor as a guest who would join in the game of Mornington Crescent. When the game started, after great ceremony, the penultimate player, the last of the panellists, won on his first move, thus denying the distinguished guest the opportunity to make a single move. The chairman apologised but explained that this was an unavoidable possibility and the guest left without having uttered a word. The show was allegedly inundated with complaints at the treatment of Sir Alec Guinness as on the actual recording Lyttelton can be heard to say, "Well I'm very sorry about that. Rather unfortunate. We would like to go on and ask you a few things about what you're doing currently, Sir Alec, but we do have to hurry on to the next game."  This story became a favourite of Lyttelton's, who claimed in interviews that the "distinguished actor" had never actually been named on the show.

Scorers
Since 18 May 1985 (in the episode in which Kenny Everett made his debut), the show has included a fictional and completely silent scorer "whose job is eased by the fact no points are actually awarded". Usually this is "the lovely Samantha", who sits on Humph's left hand. There is a seat with a microphone next to the Chairman which is "used" by Samantha. During the introductory music, Humphrey Lyttelton would stand up and "help" Samantha into her seat. In practice, the seat and microphone were only used by the producer to welcome the audience, to introduce the participants and to give any other information to the audience such as the expected date of broadcasting, and to supervise re-recordings of fluffs made in the programme.

Lyttelton would describe Samantha's social activities, usually in an apology received from the unseen character who had been detained, often with a "gentleman friend". His comments included sexual innuendo and double entendres, like "Samantha likes nothing better than a little potter in the woodshed in the morning", though many were far more daring and explicit. During early episodes of Samantha's appearance on the show, it was not completely clear that she was a fictional character, garnering complaints about the sexist and humiliating treatment she received. Producer Jon Naismith recalled "when we [Naismith and Iain Pattinson] took over the show we used to get quite a few letters accusing us of sexist references to Samantha" (the character was named after the page 3 topless model Samantha Fox). Samantha's inabilities as score-keeper often form the basis for humour; in a programme from 1997, Humph said: "It's just occurred to me that Samantha hasn't given us the score... since 1981."

Samantha has sometimes been replaced by a Swedish stand-in, Sven, or occasionally another substitute, Monica. When Margaret Thatcher left office in 1990 Lyttelton introduced a scorer named Margaret. In an episode in November 1991 both Samantha and Sven were present but occupied with each other and unable to award points.

The programme's scoring is completely non-existent. Most of the show is scripted, but in rounds such as "Sound charades", where one team of panellists have to guess the charade of the other team, the answer may be obvious (usually a pun) but the opposing team are not told the answer. In recording, it has taken them many minutes to come up with the correct answer, most of which has to be edited out before broadcast.

In rounds in which the panel must not see what the audience sees, there is the "advanced laser display-board" (in reality, a sign with the answer written on, held by Jon Naismith). These boards are sometimes described in more elaborate terms and as "so generously funded by our hosts". The names and phrases on them are conveyed to "listeners at home" by the "mystery voice", alluding to the 1960s radio programme Twenty Questions.

Correspondence
A regular feature on the programme, preceding the game Mornington Crescent, is a fictional letters section which begins with the chairman's comments ("I notice from the sheer weight of this week's postbag, we've received a little over no letters" and "I see from the number of letters raining down on us this week that the Scrabble factory has exploded again"). The invariably single letter each week is from "A Mrs Trellis of North Wales" (one of the many prompts for a cheer from the audience), whose incoherent letters usually mistake the chairman for another Radio 4 presenter or media personality. "Dear Libby" (she writes), "why oh why ... very nearly spells YOYO", or "Dear Mr Titchmarsh, never let them tell you that size isn't important. My aunt told me that, but then all my new wallpaper fell off."

Format

Introduction
The chairman introduces the show with remarks such as:

and continues by providing a little background material, usually derogatory, about the show's location:

Then the teams' introduction:

The teams are often mocked at their introduction:

Games

Many games are played on I'm Sorry I Haven't a Clue, some frequently and dozens less often. A few have been played only once, either because the joke works only once or because they were not particularly successful. Popular games include "One Song to the Tune of Another", "Mornington Crescent", "Sound Charades", "Late Arrivals", "Double Feature", "Cheddar Gorge" and "Uxbridge English Dictionary". "One Song to the Tune of Another" is always introduced using a complex analogy, despite its self-explanatory title, often ending with a joke at the expense of Colin Sell.

The panellists play as individuals or as two teams. "Celebrity What's My Line?" completely destroyed the intent of the original — for players to guess the occupation of a third party by asking yes/no questions. The I'm Sorry I Haven't a Clue version once employed the famous actress (and fan of the show) Dame Judi Dench in this role and the renowned television gardener Alan Titchmarsh. Each began by performing a mime illustrating their occupation, giving a cryptic clue to the panel (appearing to a radio listener as a short silence punctuated by exclamations from the panel and laughter from the studio audience), before fielding apparently serious questions from the teams (e.g. "Is that your own hair?" or "Do you kill people for money?"), who pretended not to know who they were.

Musical games often involve incongruities such as singing "One Song to the Tune of Another" or playing a song using only a swanee whistle and a kazoo. In "Just a Minim" – a parody of Radio 4's Just a Minute – panellists must sing a specified song avoiding repetition, deviation, or hesitation: the chosen songs often have extremely repetitive lyrics.

Humour is derived from wordplay such as puns or mockery of styles of speech. For example, in a round based on suggesting television programmes from biblical times:
They Think It's All Jehovah
I Love Lucifer
The Exodus Files

In "Uxbridge English Dictionary" the panellists contribute humorous redefinitions of words; "Puny: the Roman Catholic equivalent of tennis elbow". More puns are found in the "Arrivals at the Ball" section, of the form "Mr and Mrs X and their son (or daughter)...." the child's name forming a pun, preferably laboured and feeble. This grew out of the "drama" section of later shows in the I'm Sorry I'll Read That Again series, for example, at the Criminals' Ball, "Mr and Mrs Knee, and their Swedish son, Lars Knee".

According to Tim Brooke-Taylor, twenty per cent of the show is ad-libbed. According to Willie Rushton, it is more like fifty per cent, but he didn't think that a bad thing.

Time, destiny, fate and eternity
The show draws to a close with the chairman imparting some final words of wisdom intended to evoke time, destiny, fate and eternity, undercut with silliness. For example: "...And so, as the hunter of time blasts the moose of eternity, and the dairy counter worker of fate sighs and grabs her mop..." Lyttelton's final sign-off on the show, shortly before his death in April 2008, was:

Humour
Most of the humour is detached from the real world. Steve Punt cites it as one of his favourite radio shows because "there's no points being made or targets being attacked." Contemporary references occasionally made by participants are usually asides. The show does occasionally comment on the outside world, though from an innocent perspective. The game "Complete George Bush Quotes" was once played, in which the teams had to supply endings for phrases that George Bush had begun (see Bushism), the teams complaining that they couldn't be any funnier than the original; similar rounds with guessing or completing quotes of other well-known public figures and personalities have also been played.

Self-deprecation forms a big part of the show's humour. It frequently pokes fun at itself and its supposed low quality. For example, Lyttelton was heard to exclaim at the end of a round:
"Nietzsche said that life was a choice between suffering and boredom. He never said anything about having to put up with both at the same time."
"I'm often prone to bouts of misplaced optimism. This round's going to be a hum-dinger!"
"All good things must come to an end, so let's carry on."
An introduction to "Sound Charades", a round based on Give Us a Clue, went: "In the TV version the teams were not allowed to speak, making the games both silent and hilarious. Our version differs in just two ways."

The regular panellists are represented by the chairman to be unfunny, struggling comedians who have been doing the same act for many years. The supposed personalities of the panellists as demonstrated by the chairman, fictitious but drawn from their public personas, is also a recurring theme. Barry Cryer was often represented as a tight-fisted alcoholic who could not wait to get to the pub (but who never bought a round of drinks), while Tim Brooke-Taylor was often represented as willing to take any small performance job in his quiet career and always campaigning for repeats of The Goodies (something which Brooke-Taylor himself played upon in many rounds). The late Humphrey Lyttelton often delivered mock comments of how boring and low quality the show was and, particularly in his later years on the show, preferring to doze off rather than listen to the rounds. Pianist Colin Sell, meanwhile, is often the butt of jokes regarding his supposedly terrible musical skills (despite in reality being an accomplished musician).

According to Willie Rushton, "The show gets quite filthy at times, but the audience love it."
After fifty years on the air, one of the most important aspects of the show is its huge stock of running gags which, if not always funny in themselves, can elicit huge anticipatory laughter from the studio audience. The mere mention of Lionel Blair will often bring roars of laughter in anticipation of an outrageous double-entendre based on his supposed homosexuality (he was not gay); Similarly, particular mention of points scorer Samantha or her occasional replacement Sven (neither of whom actually exists) will typically bring anticipatory laughter in anticipation of a sexual double-entendre.

In the "Film Club" round, any reference by Graeme Garden to Bring Me the Head of Alfredo Garcia is sure to cause a similar response. The game "Wobbling Bunnies" was introduced several times by Humph, often with eager anticipation by the panel and audience, but time pressures always meant the game was never actually played. Graeme Garden and Barry Cryer frequently played the characters of two Scots, Hamish and Dougal, whose skits usually began with the phrase "You'll have had your tea?", as a stereotypical Scots miser when receiving a guest never offers any food or drink. The characters were developed into their own Radio 4 show, Hamish and Dougal. Another long-running gag involves one of the panellists putting forward a challenge of "hesitation" when another panellist leaves a long pause in the middle of speaking, a reference to Radio 4's other long-running panel show Just a Minute. (Likewise, occasionally on Just a Minute, a panellist will make a challenge of "Mornington Crescent".)
Chairman Humphrey Lyttelton frequently poked fun at Just a Minute and its chairman Nicholas Parsons. Lyttelton's successor, Jack Dee, has continued with and expanded upon this, mimicking Parsons by constantly emphasising the long experience of some panellists, and the fact that the programme can be heard all over the world.

Awards
The programme has won the Gold Sony Radio Comedy Award three times:
 1995: featuring Humphrey Lyttelton, Barry Cryer, Graeme Garden, Tim Brooke-Taylor and Willie Rushton
 2002: featuring the usual cast and Jeremy Hardy.
 2004: I'm Sorry I Haven't A Christmas Carol, featuring the usual cast with Stephen Fry, Andy Hamilton, Jeremy Hardy, Tony Hawks, Sandi Toksvig and Linda Smith.

Other awards:
 1995: Best Radio Comedy, British Comedy Award
 1997: Radio Programme of the Year, British Press Guild
 1997: Radio Programme of the Year, Voice of the Viewer and Listener
 2003: Radio Programme of the Year, Voice of the Viewer and Listener
 2003: Radio Programme of the Year, Television and Radio Industries Club
 2003: Best Comedy, Spoken Word Award
 2005: Radio Programme of the Year, Television and Radio Industries Club

In 2020 the programme was voted the greatest radio comedy of all time by a panel convened by Radio Times.

Broadcast list
Clue has been broadcast since 11 April 1972 on BBC Radio 4 with new series rotating with the other Monday night comedy staples such as The Unbelievable Truth, The Museum Of Curiosity and Just a Minute.

1st Series (1972) – 11 April–4 July [13 episodes] (Introduction of 'Word for Word' and 'One Song to the Tune of Another')
2nd Series (1973) – 30 April–23 July [13 episodes] (Including the first appearances of 'Sound Charades', a version of 'New Definitions' and the use of 'The Antidote to Panel games')
3rd Series (1974) – 28 August–2 October [6 episodes] (Willie Rushton's first appearances)
4th Series (1975) – 29 July–16 September [8 episodes] (Colin Sell's first appearance, Graeme mentions 'Gordon Bennett' for the first time as a late arrival and the name 'Pick-Up Song' is used but a different game.)
5th Series (1977) – 6 March–10 April [6 episodes] (The first series in which 'Good News, Bad News' was played and 'Pick-Up Song' in its recognisable format.)
6th Series (1978) – 22 August–24 October [10 episodes] (The first time 'Mornington Crescent' is played.)
7th Series (1979) – 16 July–17 September [10 episodes]
Christmas Special (1979) – 24 December
Christmas Special (1980) – 24 December
8th Series (1981) – 22 August–24 October [10 episodes]
Christmas Special (1981) – 24 December
9th Series (1982) – 20 March–27 March [2 episodes], 10 April-22 May [8 episodes] (The first playing of 'Just a Minim'.)
10th Series (1983) – 26 February–30 April [10 episodes]
11th Series (1984) – 7 April–9 June [10 episodes]
12th Series (1985) – 4 May–6 July [10 episodes] (Kenny Everett replaces Graeme for two shows and Samantha makes her first appearance.)
13th Series (1986) – 26 July–27 September [10 episodes] (Willie predicts his own death in 1996.)
Christmas Special (1986) – 25 December
14th Series (1987) – 17 August–19 October [10 episodes]
15th Series (1989) – 7 January–11 March [10 episodes]
16th Series (Spring 1990) – 5 February–12 March [6 episodes]
17th Series (Autumn 1990) – 17 November–22 December [6 episodes] (The first time a letter sent in by Mrs Trellis from North Wales is read out.)
18th Series (Summer 1991) – 22 June–27 July [6 episodes] (Bill Tidy replaces Tim and Humph asks 'what do points mean?' for the first time.)
19th Series (Autumn 1991) – 19 October–7 December [8 episodes] (Sven makes his first appearance standing in for Samantha.)
20th Series (Summer 1992) – 23 May–27 June [6 episodes] (The first time a show ends with a 'film club'.)
21st Series (Autumn 1992) – 14 November–19 December [6 episodes], 26 December (The first time 'Swanee-Kazoo' is played.)
22nd Series (1993) – 6 November–11 December [6 episodes]
Christmas Special (1993) – 25 December
23rd Series (Summer 1994) – 28 May–2 July [6 episodes]
24th Series (Autumn 1994) – 5 November–10 December [6 episodes]
25th Series (Summer 1995) – 27 May–1 July [6 episodes]
26th Series (Autumn 1995) – 11 November–16 December [6 episodes]
Christmas Special (1995) – 25 December (Hamish and Dougal make their first appearance.)
27th Series (Summer 1996) – 1 June–6 July [6 episodes]
28th Series (Autumn 1996) – 9 November–14 December [6 episodes] (Willie records his last show.)
29th Series (Summer 1997) – 7 June–12 July [6 episodes]
30th Series (Autumn 1997) – 8 November–13 December [6 episodes], 25 December [Compilation]
Compilations (1998) – 6 April–20 April [3 episodes]
31st Series (Summer 1998) – 27 April–1 June [6 episodes]
32nd Series (Autumn 1998) – 30 November–4 January 1999 [6 episodes]
Christmas Special (1998) – 25 December
Special (1999) – 11 January [I'm Sorry I Haven't A Desert Island]
33rd Series (Summer 1999) – 24 May–28 June [6 episodes]
34th Series (Autumn 1999) – 8 November–13 December [6 episodes]
Christmas Special (1999) – 25 December
35th Series (Summer 2000) – 22 May–26 June [6 episodes]
36th Series (Autumn 2000) – 13 November–18 December [6 episodes]
37th Series (Summer 2001) – 28 May–2 July [6 episodes] (The first time 'Uxbridge English Dictionary' is played, as 'New Meanings'.)
38th Series (Autumn 2001) – 12 November–17 December [6 episodes]
Christmas Special (2001) – 24 December
Special (2002) – 13 April [30th Anniversary Special]
39th Series (Summer 2002) – 20 May–24 June [6 episodes]
40th Series (Autumn 2002) – 18 November–23 December [6 episodes]
41st Series (Summer 2003) – 26 May–30 June [6 episodes]
42nd Series (Autumn 2003) – 17 November–22 December [6 episodes], 22 December [Compilation], 25 December [I'm Sorry I Haven't A Christmas Carol]
43rd Series – (Summer 2004) – 31 May–5 July [6 episodes]
44th Series – (Winter 2004) – 6 December 2004 – 17 January 2005 [6 episodes], 27 December [Compilation]
45th Series – (Summer 2005) – 30 May–4 July [6 episodes]
Special (2005) – 1 September [Edinburgh Festival Special]
46th Series – (Autumn 2005) – 14 November–26 December [6 episodes], 12 December [Repeat of Edinburgh Festival Special]
Special (2005) – 24 December [In Search of Mornington Crescent]
47th Series (2006) – 22 May-26 June [6 episodes]
48th Series (2006) – 13 November–18 December [6 episodes]
49th Series (2007) – 4 June–9 July [6 episodes]
50th Series (2007) – 12 November–17 December [6 episodes], 24 December [compilation], 25 December [Humph In Wonderland]
51st Series (2009) – 15 June–20 July [6 episodes]
52nd Series (2009) – 16 November–21 December [6 episodes]
53rd Series (2010) – 21 June–26 July [6 episodes]
54th Series (2010–2011) – 27 December–31 January [6 episodes]
55th Series (2011) – 27 June–1 August [6 episodes]
56th Series (2011) – 14 November–19 December [6 episodes]
57th Series (2012) – 25 June–30 July [6 episodes]
58th Series (2012) – 12 November–24 December [6 episodes and one Christmas special]
59th Series (2013) – 1 July–5 August [6 episodes]
60th Series (2013) – 11 November–16 December [6 episodes]
61st Series (2014) – 30 June–4 August [6 episodes]
62nd Series (2014) – 17 November–22 December [6 episodes]
63rd Series (2015) – 13 July–17 August [6 episodes]
64th Series (2015–2016) 30 November–4 January [6 episodes]
65th Series (2016) – 27 June–1 August [6 episodes]
66th Series (2016) – 14 November–19 December [6 episodes]
67th Series (2017) – 26 June–31 July [6 episodes]
68th Series (2017) – 13 November–18 December [6 episodes]
69th Series (2018) – 25 June–30 July [6 episodes]
70th Series (2018) – 12 November–17 December [6 episodes]
71st Series (2019) – 24 June–29 July [6 episodes]
72nd Series (2019) – 11 November–16 December [6 episodes]
73rd Series (2020) – 11 November–18 November [2 episodes] (Recording in March curtailed due to COVID-19 pandemic. Tim Brooke-Taylor records his final show)
74th Series (2020) – 25 November–29 December [4 episodes] (Recorded from panellists' homes to make up a full 6-episode series)
75th Series (2021) – 14 June–19 July [6 episodes]
76th Series (2021–2022) – 29 November–3 January [6 episodes]
77th Series (2022) – 11 July–15 August [6 episodes]

Excluding compilations and repeats, this totals 521 episodes (up to series 77). Some early episodes of the series, including the first, were wiped in the late 1970s. Following the BBC's Treasure Hunt appeal for missing material in 2002, several shows were recovered from off-air recordings made by listeners. Ultimately, a complete archive (barring the opening music in places) was assembled, though the quality was somewhat poor for early episodes.

Tours

2007
In 2007, I'm Sorry I Haven't a Clue: The Official Stage Tour visited nine locations across England. While the broadcast shows are recorded on location, this was the first ISIHAC touring stage show in the show's 35-year history. It was a best of show, featuring favourite rounds from the previous 35 years, and the guest panellist was Jeremy Hardy. The shows were not recorded for broadcast on Radio 4, although it was suggested that they may be recorded for release as part of the BBC Radio Collection.

Dates
 Tuesday 28 August 2007 – Bristol Hippodrome
 Thursday 30 August 2007 – Leeds Grand Theatre
 Sunday 9 September 2007 – Theatre Royal, Nottingham
 Monday 10 September 2007 – Derngate, Northampton
 Monday 17 September 2007 – Assembly Hall Theatre, Tunbridge Wells
 Tuesday 18 September 2007 – Birmingham Hippodrome
 Wednesday 19 September 2007 – Birmingham Hippodrome
 Tuesday 25 September 2007 – Ipswich Regent
 Wednesday 26 September 2007 – New Theatre Oxford
 Friday 5 October 2007 – The Hexagon, Reading (as part of the Reading Comedy Festival)
 Monday 8 October 2007 – Brighton Dome (as part of the Brighton Comedy Festival)

2008
In 2008, I'm Sorry I Haven't a Clue: The Official Stage Tour embarked on another best of tour, with the intention of visiting many parts of the UK that were missed in the autumn 2007 dates.

Dates
 Monday 21 January 2008 – Wolverhampton Grand Theatre
 Wednesday 23 January 2008 – The Anvil, Basingstoke
 Sunday 24 February 2008 – Cambridge Corn Exchange
 Monday 10 March 2008 – Buxton Opera House
 Friday 14 March 2008 – Wales Millennium Centre, Cardiff
 Sunday 16 March 2008 – Theatre Royal, Plymouth
 Thursday 27 March 2008 – Congress Theatre, Eastbourne
 Sunday 30 March 2008 – Edinburgh Festival Theatre
 Thursday 3 April 2008 – Hammersmith Apollo, London
 Sunday 6 April 2008 – The Lowry, Salford
 Saturday 12 April 2008 – Harrogate International Centre
 Tuesday 22 April 2008 – Pavilion Theatre (Bournemouth) (Due to Humphrey Lyttelton's hospitalisation, the show was presented by Rob Brydon)

The show at the Lowry in Salford was filmed and broadcast on BBC Four on 13 September 2008. Although some unaired pilots had previously been made, this was the first time ISIHAC has been shown on television. An extended version was released on DVD on 10 November 2008.

2009

The regular panellists decided to continue the annual stage tour despite Lyttelton's death, with Jack Dee (one of the 51st series' hosts) as chairman for the tour shows. Jeremy Hardy remained as the guest participant.

Dates
Wednesday 22 July 2009 – The Orchard Theatre, Dartford (Cancelled due to power cut)
Thursday 23 July 2009 – New Victoria Theatre, Woking
Saturday 25 July 2009 – The Sands Centre, Carlisle
Friday 18 September 2009 – Manchester Opera House
Sunday 20 September 2009 – Bristol Hippodrome
Monday 21 September 2009 – Portsmouth Guildhall
Tuesday 22 September 2009 – Cambridge Corn Exchange
Wednesday 23 September 2009 – Nottingham Royal Concert Hall
Friday 25 September 2009 – St George's Hall, Bradford
Saturday 26 September 2009 – Everyman Theatre, Cheltenham
Sunday 27 September 2009 – New Wimbledon Theatre
Monday 28 September 2009 – Symphony Hall, Birmingham
Tuesday 29 September 2009 – Southport Theatre
Wednesday 30 September 2009 – Grand Opera House (York)
Saturday 3 October 2009 – Derngate, Northampton
Sunday 4 October 2009 – The Anvil, Basingstoke
Monday 5 October 2009 – Princess Theatre, Torquay
Tuesday 6 October 2009 – Congress Theatre, Eastbourne
Wednesday 7 October 2009 – De Montfort Hall, Leicester

2010
Another set of tour dates, with Jack Dee as chairman and Jeremy Hardy as guest panellist, took place in 2010.

Dates
Sunday 14 November 2010 – New Theatre, Cardiff
Monday 15 November 2010 – Wolverhampton Grand Theatre
Tuesday 16 November 2010 – Assembly Hall Theatre, Tunbridge Wells
Thursday 18 November 2010 – The Hexagon, Reading
Monday 6 December 2010 – Chichester Festival Theatre
Wednesday 8 December 2010 – Newcastle City Hall
Sunday 12 December 2010 – Ipswich Regent
Monday 13 December 2010 – New Theatre Oxford

2011 and 2012

The show did not tour between 2011 and 2013, but there were a couple of one-off shows performed during this time with Dee as chairman and Hardy as guest panellist.

Dates
Sunday 11 September 2011 – The Lowry, Salford
Monday 5 March 2012 – New Theatre Oxford

2014
The touring show resumed in 2014, again with Dee in the chair and Hardy as the guest panellist.

Dates
Saturday 18 January 2014 – Brighton Dome
Sunday 19 January 2014 – The Hexagon, Reading
Monday 20 January 2014 – Wales Millennium Centre, Cardiff
Thursday 30 January 2014 – King's Theatre, Glasgow
Monday 10 February 2014 – Ipswich Regent
Tuesday 11 February 2014 – Congress Theatre, Eastbourne
Thursday 13 February 2014 – Fairfield Halls, Croydon
Tuesday 25 February 2014 – Newcastle City Hall
Saturday 31 March 2014 – Sheffield City Hall
Sunday 1 April 2014 – Palace Theatre, Manchester
Sunday 27 April 2014 – Birmingham Hippodrome
Monday 28 April 2014 – Cambridge Corn Exchange
Saturday 17 May 2014 – Colston Hall, Bristol
Monday 19 May 2014 – New Wimbledon Theatre
Saturday 2 June 2014 – Leeds Grand Theatre

2015
The sixth tour took place in 2015, again with Dee in the chair and Hardy as the guest panellist. Sandi Toksvig deputised for Dee on some dates.

Dates
Thursday 8 January 2015 – Sunderland Empire
Friday 9 January 2015 – St George's Hall, Bradford
Saturday 10 January 2015 – Barbican Centre, York
Sunday 11 January 2015 – Liverpool Empire
Thursday 15 January 2015 – G Live, Guildford
Friday 16 January 2015 – Watford Colosseum
Saturday 17 January 2015 – Royal Hall, Harrogate
Sunday 18 January 2015 – The Lowry, Salford
Wednesday 28 January 2015 – Kings Theatre, Southsea
Thursday 29 January 2015 – Pavilion Theatre (Bournemouth)
Saturday 21 February 2015 – The Centaur, Cheltenham
Sunday 22 February 2015 – Butterworth Hall, Warwick Arts Centre, Coventry
Thursday 5 March 2015 – The Waterfront, Belfast
Saturday 7 March 2015 – Royal Concert Hall, Nottingham
Sunday 8 March 2015 – Preston Guild Hall
Monday 16 March 2015 – Mayflower Theatre, Southampton
Sunday 9 August 2015 – Edinburgh Playhouse (as part of the Edinburgh Festival Fringe)

2016
The seventh tour took place in 2016, again with Dee in the chair. Graeme Garden was absent from this tour so Jeremy Hardy took his place, with Miles Jupp as the guest panellist.

Dates
Monday 4 January 2016 – Marlowe Theatre, Canterbury
Tuesday 5 January 2016 – Theatre Royal, Norwich
Monday 18 January 2016 – Milton Keynes Theatre
Tuesday 19 January 2016 – Derngate, Northampton
Monday 25 January 2016 – Victoria Theatre, Halifax
Friday 29 January 2016 – Wycombe Swan
Saturday 30 January 2016 – Brighton Dome
Sunday 31 January 2016 – The Hexagon, Reading
Monday 1 February 2016 – Cliffs Pavilion, Southend-on-Sea
Saturday 6 February 2016 – Plymouth Pavilions
Monday 8 February 2016 – New Victoria Theatre, Woking

2017
The eighth tour took place in 2017, again with Dee in the chair. Garden was again absent so Hardy took his place once more, with Tony Hawks as the guest panellist.

Dates
Saturday 7 January 2017 – The Sands Centre, Carlisle
Sunday 8 January 2017 – The Spa, Scarborough
Wednesday 18 January 2017 – Chichester Festival Theatre
Thursday 19 January 2017 – New Theatre Oxford
Friday 20 January 2017 – The Anvil, Basingstoke
Monday 23 January 2017 – De Montfort Hall, Leicester
Tuesday 24 January 2017 – Venue Cymru, Llandudno
Friday 3 February 2017 – Charter Hall, Colchester
Saturday 4 February 2017 – Winter Gardens, Margate
Thursday 23 February 2017 – Southport Theatre
Friday 24 February 2017 – The Sage, Gateshead
Sunday 26 February 2017 – Assembly Hall Theatre, Tunbridge Wells
Monday 27 February 2017 – Colston Hall, Bristol
Tuesday 28 February 2017 – City Hall, Salisbury
Sunday 23 July 2017 – The Lowry, Salford

2019
A one-off special stage show was advertised as in January 2019 to take place the following February. Following the death of regular guest Jeremy Hardy, the special show became a tribute to him, with Cryer, Garden and Brooke-Taylor joined by several guests – Rob Brydon, Tony Hawks, David Mitchell, Rory Bremner, Sandi Toksvig and Andy Hamilton.

Sunday 24 February 2019 – New Theatre Oxford

2020
A ninth tour was announced in October 2019 to take place in early 2020. Jack Dee, Colin Sell and Tim Brooke-Taylor were joined by Tony Hawks and Miles Jupp on the panel, with the fourth spot rotating between Rory Bremner, Richard Osman and John Finnemore. Marcus Brigstocke also appeared in place of Jupp on some dates, and Barry Cryer made a special appearance at the Watford Colosseum show.

Sunday 5 January 2020 – Nottingham Royal Concert Hall (Rory Bremner as guest panellist)
Monday 6 January 2020 – St. David's Hall, Cardiff (Bremner as guest panellist)
Tuesday 7 January 2020 – Bristol Hippodrome (Bremner as guest panellist)
Sunday 12 January 2020 – New Wimbledon Theatre (Richard Osman as guest panellist)
Monday 13 January 2020 – The Alexandra, Birmingham (Bremner as guest panellist)
Tuesday 14 January 2020 – Sheffield City Hall (Bremner as guest panellist)
Wednesday 15 January 2020 – Hull City Hall (Bremner as guest panellist)
Friday 17 January 2020 – Festival Theatre, Edinburgh (Osman as guest panellist)
Saturday 18 January 2020 – Sunderland Empire (Osman as guest panellist)
Sunday 19 January 2020 – Bridgewater Hall, Manchester (Osman as guest panellist)
Monday 20 January 2020 – Wolverhampton Grand Theatre (Marcus Brigstocke and John Finnemore as guest panellists)
Thursday 23 January 2020 – Lighthouse, Poole (Brigstocke and Finnemore as guest panellists)
Friday 24 January 2020 – Assembly Hall, Worthing (Osman as guest panellist)
Monday 27 January 2020 – St. George's Hall, Bradford (Osman as guest panellist)
Tuesday 28 January 2020 – Harrogate Convention Centre (Brigstocke and Osman as guest panellists)
Friday 31 January 2020 – Watford Colosseum (Osman as guest panellist and Cryer makes an appearance)
Saturday 1 February 2020 – Ipswich Regent (Osman as guest panellist)
Sunday 2 February 2020 – Congress Theatre, Eastbourne (Osman as guest panellist)

2022
A tenth tour was announced in November 2021 to take place in early 2022. All dates feature Tony Hawks and Rory Bremner versus Miles Jupp and Pippa Evans on the panel, with the exception of the Stockton date which featured Marcus Brigstocke in place of Bremner, and the Cambridge date, where Brigstocke replaced Jupp at the last minute.

Wednesday 2 February 2022 – G Live, Guildford
Thursday 17 February 2022 – Stockton Globe
Thursday 24 February 2022 – Charter Hall, Colchester
Friday 25 February 2022 – Theatre Royal, Norwich
Saturday 26 February 2022 – Wycombe Swan
Monday 28 February 2022 – Cambridge Corn Exchange
Monday 7 March 2022 – Hall for Cornwall, Truro
Tuesday 8 March 2022 – Exeter Northcott Theatre
Wednesday 9 March 2022 – Kings Theatre, Southsea

A further six dates were announced in October 2022 for the end of the year, featuring Bremner, Brigstocke, Evans and Jupp:

Sunday 20 November 2022 – Manchester Opera House
Monday 21 November 2022 – St George's Hall, Bradford
Saturday 3 December 2022 – Bournemouth International Centre
Monday 5 December 2022 – Brighton Dome
Tuesday 6 December 2022 – Congress Theatre, Eastbourne
Wednesday 7 December 2022 – Assembly Hall, Worthing

2023
Tuesday 21 February 2023 – The Forum, Bath (Bremner, Brigstocke, Evans and Hawks)
Wednesday 22 February 2023 – De Montfort Hall, Leicester (Bremner, Brigstocke, Evans and Hawks)
Monday 27 February 2023 – New Theatre, Oxford (Bremner, Evans, Hawks and Harry Hill)
Tuesday 28 February 2023 – The Anvil, Basingstoke (Bremner, Brigstocke, Evans and Hawks)
Wednesday 1 March 2023 – New Victoria Theatre, Woking (Bremner, Brigstocke, Evans and Hawks)
Thursday 2 March 2023 – Butterworth Hall, Warwick (Evans, Hawks, Hill and Milton Jones)
Friday 3 March 2023 – Royal Concert Hall, Nottingham (Brigstocke, Evans, Hawks and Jones)
Monday 6 March 2023 – York Barbican (Brigstocke, Evans, Hawks and Jones)
Tuesday 7 March 2023 – Sheffield City Hall (Brigstocke, Evans, Hawks and Jones)
Wednesday 8 March 2023 – Victoria Theatre, Halifax (Bremner, Evans, Jones and Rachel Parris)
Thursday 9 March 2023 – Huddersfield Town Hall (Bremner, Evans, Jones and Parris)
Friday 10 March 2023 – Scarborough Spa (Bremner, Brigstocke, Evans and Jones)
Sunday 12 March 2023 – Edinburgh Playhouse (Bremner, Evans, Hawks and Fred MacAulay)
Monday 13 March 2023 – King's Theatre, Glasgow (Bremner, Brigstocke, Evans and MacAulay)
Tuesday 14 March 2023 – Perth Concert Hall (Bremner, Brigstocke, Evans and MacAulay)
Wednesday 15 March 2023 – Caird Hall, Dundee (Bremner, Brigstocke, Evans and MacAulay)
Saturday 18 March 2023 – The Hexagon, Reading (Bremner, Evans, Hawks and Jones)
Sunday 19 March 2023 – St David's Hall, Cardiff (Bremner, Brigstocke, Evans and Jones)

BBC Audiobook releases
Volume 1
Volume 2
Volume 3
Volume 4
Volume 5
Volume 6
Volume 7
Volume 8
Volume 9
Volume 10
Volume 11
Volume 12
Volume 13
Volume 14
Volume 15
Collection 1 [Vols 1–3]
Collection 2 [Vols 4–6]
Collection 3 [Vols 7–9]
Anniversary Special [Collection of Three programmes: "30th Anniversary Special", "Sorry I Haven't A Desert Island", and the first episode broadcast (11 April 1972)]
I'm Sorry I Haven't A Christmas Clue
Live 1
Live 2
In Search of Mornington Crescent
I'm Sorry I Haven't A Clue: Humph in Wonderland

WTBS recordings
Episodes of I'm Sorry I Haven't a Clue were included in the package of programmes held in 20 underground radio stations of the BBC's Wartime Broadcasting Service (WTBS), designed to provide public information and morale-boosting broadcasts for 100 days after a nuclear attack.

References

External links

 (Previous website)

The officially unofficial I'm Sorry I Haven't a Clue website featuring background information and news.
The I'm Sorry I Haven't a Clue Info Site featuring lists of episodes and games (with quotes)
 353 episodes.

 
1972 radio programme debuts
1970s British game shows
1980s British game shows
1990s British game shows
2000s British game shows
2010s British game shows
2020s British game shows
BBC panel games
BBC Radio 4 programmes
BBC Radio comedy programmes
British panel games
Improvisational television series